A Guide for Finishers: Golden Hair (Posobie dlya konchayushchikh: Volos Zlata) was the second of two CD compilations released to mark Coil's first performance in Russia. It is a collection of their industrial music style works. The titles were devised by the Russian musician and Coil collaborator Ivan Pavlov.

Release history
The album was released an edition of 1,000 copies.
This compilation, as well as its twin Пособие для начинающих: Глас Се́ребра, were later released as the double CD The Golden Hare with a Voice of Silver.

Song origins
 "Panic" and "Solar Lodge" were originally released on Scatology.
 "First Dark Ride" was originally released on the 12" "Nasa Arab" as Coil vs. The Eskaton. The song was later released on Unnatural History III.
 "Further Back And Faster" was originally released on Love's Secret Domain.
 "Red Skeletons" and "Blue Rats" were originally released on A Thousand Lights in a Darkened Room as Black Light District.
 "Scope" was originally released on "Wrong Eye/Scope" and later released on Unnatural History III.
 "A.Y.O.R." was previously available in a slightly longer form on the bootleg Backwards. The song was later remade as "It's in My Blood" and released on The Ape of Naples.
 "The First Five Minutes After Death" is incorrectly labeled "The First Five Minutes After Violent Death". "The First Five Minutes After Death" originally appeared on Horse Rotorvator - as did "The Anal Staircase" - and has a track timing of 4:45, while "The First Five Minutes After Violent Death" originally appeared on Gold Is the Metal (With the Broadest Shoulders) with a track timing of 2:43 due to a sequencing error, although the remastered/revised version is 5:00.

Track listing
 "Panic" – 4:18
 "First Dark Ride" – 10:50
 "Further Back and Faster" – 7:55
 "The Anal Staircase" – 3:57
 "Red Skeletons" – 7:32
 "Scope" – 6:35
 "Solar Lodge" – 5:36
 "Blue Rats" – 3:08
 "A.Y.O.R." – 3:11
 "The First Five Minutes After Death" – 4:59

References

External links
 
 
 A Guide for Finishers: A Golden Hair at Brainwashed

2001 compilation albums
Coil (band) compilation albums